Montaigu-de-Quercy is a commune in the Tarn-et-Garonne department in the Occitanie region in southern France.

Bournac 
Former French commune in Agenais reunited in 1828 with the commune of Montaigu-de-Quercy (formerly known as Montagut d'Agenés in occitan).

References

Communes of Tarn-et-Garonne